Kota Airport  is a domestic airport in Kota in the state of Rajasthan, India.

History
Spread over 152 acres, Kota Airport was originally built by the Royal family of the princely state of Kota and was taken over by the government in 1951. This Airport Also Known As Rajputana Airport. Originally serviced by Indian Airlines Dakota aircraft and later by Vayudoot and Jagson Airlines, shutdown of major industries and Kota becoming a major railway junction effected decreased demand for air transport and the withdrawal of the airlines.

Current status
Since 1997, there have been no scheduled operations at this airport, though there has been talk of Air India starting flights to Mumbai and Delhi. The last airline to fly to Kota was Vayudoot. In 2005, it was reported that Airports Authority of India, which maintains the airport spends Rs. 6.3 million annually on maintenance, whereas the income is Rs. 600,000, while six acres of the airports property has been encroached upon by slums.
  
Development of Greenfield airport at Kota: The representative of Rajasthan 
Government intimated that runway length of Existing Kota Airport is only 4000 ft., which 
restricts flight operations under RCS. A new Greenfield Airport is to be constructed in Kota. 
State Government has earmarked required land for this purpose. State Government has 
provided Meteorological Information of past 10 years and AAI has carried out pre-
feasibility survey & provided its report to the State Government. Further, AAI has been 
requested twice to carry out Site and OLS Survey and to provide further course of action to 
be taken by the State Government, which is awaited. Directions need to be issued to AAI 
for early completion of the same. For development of Greenfield airport at Kota, 1250
Acres of land has to be acquired by the State Government and handed over to AAI for 
development of New Greenfield Airport.

References

External links

Airports in Rajasthan
Buildings and structures in Kota, Rajasthan
Transport in Kota, Rajasthan
Airports with year of establishment missing